Oxyopes daksina, is a species of spider of the genus Oxyopes. It is found in China and Sri Lanka.

See also
 List of Oxyopidae species

References

Oxyopidae
Spiders of Asia
Spiders described in 1892